Blackadder is a hamlet on the B6460, in the Scottish Borders area of Scotland, located at .

Places nearby include Allanton, Duns, Edrom, Fogo, Gavinton, and  Whitsome.

See also
List of places in the Scottish Borders
List of places in Scotland

Villages in the Scottish Borders